is a town located in Saitama Prefecture, Japan. , the town had an estimated population of 13,369 in 5774 households and a population density of 280 persons per km².

Geography
Kamikawa is located on the extreme western border of Saitama Prefecture, separated from Gunma Prefecture by the Kanna River, and isolated from the remainder of Saitama by the Chichibu Mountains.

Surrounding municipalities
Saitama Prefecture
 Honjō
 Chichibu
 Kamisato
 Minano
Gunma Prefecture
 Fujioka

Climate
Kamikawa has a humid subtropical climate (Köppen Cfa) characterized by warm summers and cool winters with light to no snowfall.  The average annual temperature in Kamikawa is 12.6 °C. The average annual rainfall is 2028 mm with September as the wettest month. The temperatures are highest on average in August, at around 24.0 °C, and lowest in January, at around 1.3 °C.

Demographics
Per Japanese census data, the population of Kamikawa has remained relatively steady over the past 70 years.

History
The area around Kamikawa was part of ancient Musashi Province. The village of Tanshō was created within Kami District, Saitama and the villages of Wakaizumi and Aoyagi were created within Kodama District, Saitama with the establishment of the modern municipalities system on April 1, 1889. Kami District was abolished in 1896, becoming part of Kodama District. On December 1, 1949, Wakaizumi split into Watarase and Aguhara.
On May 3, 1954 the Tanshō and Aoyagi merged to form the village of Kamikawa. Kamikawa annexed Watarase on May 3, 1957, and was elevated to town status on October 1, 1987. On January 1, 2006, Kamikawa merged with neighboring Kamiizumi village.

Government
Kamikawa has a mayor-council form of government with a directly elected mayor and a unicameral town council of 12 members. Kamikawa, together with the city of Honjō and town of Kamisato, contributes two members to the Saitama Prefectural Assembly. In terms of national politics, the town is part of Saitama 11th district of the lower house of the Diet of Japan.

Economy
Kamikawa has some light manufacturing; however, many people commute to neighboring Honjō.

Education
Kamikawa has four public elementary schools and one public middle school operated by the town government. The town does not have a high school.

Transportation

Railway
 JR East - Hachikō Line

Highway

Local attractions
 Kanasana Shrine 
 Mizube Koen　
Sanba Gorge
Shimokubo Dam
Shinsui Dam

References

External links

Official Website 

Towns in Saitama Prefecture
Kamikawa, Saitama